"Santa Dog '78" was a reworking of the song "Fire" from the original "Santa Dog" double single by the Residents.  It was released in December 1978, packaged in a special picture sleeve and sold through mail-order only.  The total run was 2700 copies.

The B-side is the original "Fire", remastered at 40 RPM.

Track listing
 "Santa Dog '78"
 "Fire"

References

1978 songs
1978 singles
The Residents songs